Henrik Jørgensen is a Danish former footballer who played as a goalkeeper. He is currently goalkeeping coach at Vejle Boldklub.

Jørgensen spent the first few years of his career in his native Denmark, playing for sides such as Boldklubben 1909, AGF and Viborg FF. Jørgensen moved to Scottish side Dundee United at the start of the 1994-95 season, joining the Scottish Cup winners as replacement for Guido van de Kamp. In his first game, Jorgensen conceded five goals and although he featured in the following Scottish League Cup match, keeping a clean sheet, his only other first-team appearance was as a substitute. His transfer to United from Viborg was brought into question some months later when it was reported that the transfer was the centre of 'bung' allegations, with United denying the earlier sacking of manager Ivan Golac was related to the incident. Several months later, the Scottish FA announced it would ask the Danish FA for information regarding the transfer. Jorgensen moved on to South Korean side Suwon Samsung Bluewings and only appeared League Cup 5 matches and stayed in Asia for a spell with Thai side Rajpracha.

In September 2008, Jorgensen joined Vejle Boldklub as goalkeeping coach after being "away for a few years".

References

External links

See also
 Dundee United F.C. season 1994-95

1966 births
Living people
Boldklubben 1909 players
Aarhus Gymnastikforening players
Viborg FF players
Dundee United F.C. players
Suwon Samsung Bluewings players
Danish men's footballers
Scottish Football League players
K League 1 players
Expatriate footballers in Scotland
Expatriate footballers in South Korea
Expatriate footballers in Thailand
Association football goalkeepers